Haqq–Muhammad–Ali refers to a mystical communion (Arabic: اتحاد, ittiḥad) in Alevism that involves Haqq (‘Truth’ referring to the divine nature of Allah), Muhammad ('Yol' or Sunnah referring to the Jem (Alevism)) and Ali (‘Nūr’ referring to the Awliya).

The concept of Ittihad in Alevism

In Alevi thought there are three creative principles: the latent breath called Haqq or Allah; the prototypal human which is made up of active and passive principles called Yol, Sunnah or Muhammad (the Jem); and the divine light called Nur expressed as Ali. Comparisons between communion (ittihad) in Alevism and the Christian trinity, whose three principles are called the Father, the Son and the Holy Spirit, notwithstanding, it is not comparable with the tritheistic conceptions of Hinduism, with Brahma, Shiva and Vishnu, and certainly not with polytheistic ancient Egypt in Osiris, Isis and Horus, one cannot accurately depict such examples as being representative of the Haqq–Muhammad–Ali communion (ittihad), since according to Alevi or Bektashi beliefs (Wahdat al-mawjud), only Allah is a real entity, Muhammad and Ali being simple manifestations of the way (Yol) and the light (Noor) of Allah (Haqq) and not of Allah himself, hence they are neither equal to it nor separate independent entities. This doctrine does, however, bear similarities to the Smarta Hindu view of Brahman. In Alevism, Muhammad is the means by which the Nasut (human nature) of the Avlioh (Saints) achieve ittihad (communion) with Haqq being the Lahut (divine nature) of Allah. It has more in common with theosis and the distinction and unity of the divine and human physes in orthodox Christology than it does with any kind of tritheism.

The Alevi doctrine
Allah is divine consciousness which first generates and gives shape to the Kull-i Nafs, a latent passive energy existing within Godhead. Kull-i Nafs is actually the apparent power of God to give life form, almost like a womb in that it is a place of manifestation where the concealed potential within Allah can be known and made visible. Thus, the physical universe is a mirror image of Allah. Kull-i Nafs reflects the spirit or divine consciousness of Allah. Nafs is Arabic for breath and it is the breath that binds the spirit with Allah. Kull-i Nafs is also envisioned as the Universal Soul or Soul Body as it is the divine consciousness reflected through the breath of Allah which gives this soul its own life and forms the Universal Human, the prototypal human, made manifest in Muhammad. However, the prototypal human is not male or female, but is a perfect interplay between the two in much the same way as the Taoists envision the Taiji. Within this prototypal human active energies contain passive and passive contain active. The light or Nur which links the two together is represented by Ali.

Alevis feel no difficulty in speaking about God as a unity of heart, mind and spirit but believe that the term Hak-Muhammed-Ali aşkına (for the love of God-Muhammad-Ali) has nothing to do with a tritheistic polytheism and is misinterpreted by outsiders. According to them it's a short way to refer to Allah as the only One to be worshipped, Muhammad as the Rasul and Ali as wali along with the Twelve Imams in Alevism. Just like Shia Muslims Alevis say: "La ilahe ilallah, Muhammadden Resulullah, Aliyyen Veliyullah" (There is no god but God, Muhammad is His messenger, Ali is His wali).

Alevis believe that all prophets and saints were strictly monotheists.

Quran 18:110: Say, "I am only a man like you, to whom has been revealed that your god is one God. So whoever would hope for the meeting with his Lord - let him do righteous work and not associate in the worship of his Lord anyone."

Quran 41:6: Say, "I am only a man like you to whom it has been revealed that your god is but one God; so take a straight course to Him and seek His forgiveness." And woe to those who associate others with Allah

See also
Ghulat
Proto-Indo-Iranian religion
Proto-Indo-European religion
Religious humanism
Sufism
Trinity

References 

Alevism